Anja Drev (born 9 July 1997) is a Slovenian deaf female alpine skier. She competed at the 2015 Winter Deaflympics and participated in the women's downhill, giant slalom, slalom, Super-G and super combined events. 

She claimed a bronze medal in the women's downhill event as the other alpine skiing events were mainly dominated by Czech alpine skier, Tereza Kmochová.

References 

1997 births
Living people
Slovenian female alpine skiers
Deaf skiers
Slovenian deaf people
Alpine skiers at the 2015 Winter Deaflympics
Deaflympic bronze medalists for Slovenia